Notitiae, subtitled Commentarii ad nuntia de re liturgica edenda, is the official bimonthly journal of the Vatican dicastery of the Congregation for Divine Worship.

Beginning in 1965, it has published all of the Holy See's official documents along with commentary, scholarly articles, new liturgical texts, reports of meetings, responses to dubia, and the speeches of the Pope on all matters having to do with the liturgy of the Roman rite. In 2004, its subtitle was shortened to simply Commentarii.

References

 
Monthly journals